Bambuterol (INN) is a long-acting β adrenoceptor agonist (LABA) used in the treatment of asthma; it also is a prodrug of terbutaline. Commercially, the AstraZeneca pharmaceutical company produces and markets bambuterol as Bambec and Oxeol.

It is not available in the U.S.

Indications
As other LABAs, bambuterol is used in the long-term management of persistent asthma. It should not be used as a rescue medication for short-term relief of asthma symptoms.

Contraindications
Bambuterol is contraindicated in pregnancy and in people with seriously impaired liver function. It can be used by people with renal impairment, but dose adjustments are necessary.

Adverse effects
The adverse effect profile of bambuterol is similar to that of salbutamol, and may include fatigue, nausea, palpitations, headache, dizziness and tremor.

Interactions 

Concomitant administration of bambuterol with corticosteroids, diuretics, and xanthine derivatives (such as theophylline) increases the risk of hypokalemia (decreased levels of potassium in the blood).

Bambuterol acts as a cholinesterase inhibitor, and can prolong the duration of action of suxamethonium (succinylcholine) and other drugs whose breakdown in the body depends on cholinesterase function. Butyrylcholinesterase activity returns to normal approximately two weeks after bambuterol is stopped. It can also enhance the effects of non-depolarizing neuromuscular blockers, such as vecuronium bromide.

References 

Beta2-adrenergic agonists
Carbamates
Prodrugs
AstraZeneca brands
Phenylethanolamines